{{DISPLAYTITLE:C4H7N}}
The molecular formula C4H7N (molar mass: 69.10 g/mol, exact mass: 69.05785 u) may refer to:

 Butyronitrile, or propyl cyanide
 Isopropyl cyanide
 Pyrroline
 2-Azabicyclo[1.1.1]pentane

Molecular formulas